Trentham Cliffs is a locality in New South Wales, Australia, located approximately 10 km north-east of Mildura, Victoria.

References

Towns in New South Wales
Wentworth Shire